Winford Ansley Kellum (April 11, 1876 – August 10, 1951) was a starting pitcher in Major League Baseball who played between  and  for the Boston Americans (1901), Cincinnati Reds (1904) and St. Louis Cardinals (1905). Listed at 5'10", 190 lb., Kellum was a switch-hitter and threw left-handed.

Optimistically nicknamed "Win", Kellum became the first Opening Day starting pitcher in Boston American League franchise's history, as they lost to the host Baltimore Orioles, 10–6, at Oriole Park (April 26, 1901). He went 2–3 with a 6.38 ERA for the rest of season.

Kellum rebounded in 1902, going 25–10 the minor league Indianapolis Indians, champions of the newly formed American Association. After the regular season, he pitched with barnstormers largely made up of Cincinnati National League team. After that, he enjoyed his best season in the majors with the 1904 Reds, going 15–10 while recording career-highs in ERA (2.60), complete games (22) and innings (224). He also pitched for the Cardinals in 1905, his last major league season, and went 3–3 with a  2.92 ERA.

Kellum died in Big Rapids, Michigan at age 75.

See also
List of Major League Baseball players from Canada

Sources

Baseball Library , April 1901
1901 Boston Americans
SABR Biography Project

1876 births
1951 deaths
Baseball people from Ontario
Boston Americans players
Canadian expatriate baseball players in the United States
Cincinnati Reds players
St. Louis Cardinals players
Major League Baseball pitchers
Major League Baseball players from Canada
Sportspeople from Norfolk County, Ontario
Quincy Browns players
Quincy Ravens players
Montgomery Senators players
Indianapolis Hoosiers (minor league) players
Washington Browns players
Indianapolis Indians players
Mansfield Haymakers players
New Orleans Pelicans (baseball) players
Minneapolis Millers (baseball) players
Toledo Mud Hens players
Nashville Vols players